Alexander Nikolaevich Varchenko (born February 6, 1949) is a Soviet and Russian mathematician working in geometry, topology, combinatorics and mathematical physics.

Education and career
From 1964 to 1966 Varchenko studied at the Moscow Kolmogorov boarding school No. 18 for gifted high school students, where Andrey Kolmogorov and Ya. A. Smorodinsky were lecturing mathematics and physics. Varchenko graduated from Moscow State University in 1971. He was a student of Vladimir Arnold. Varchenko defended his Ph.D. thesis Theorems on Topological Equisingularity of Families of Algebraic Sets and Maps in 1974 and Doctor of Science thesis Asymptotics of Integrals and Algebro-Geometric Invariants of Critical Points of Functions in 1982. From 1974 to 1984 he was a research scientist at the Moscow State University, in 1985–1990 a professor at the Gubkin Institute of Gas and Oil, and since 1991 he has been the Ernest Eliel Professor at the University of North Carolina at Chapel Hill.

Research
In 1969 Varchenko identified the monodromy group of a critical point of type   of a function of an odd number of variables with the symmetric group   which is the Weyl group of the simple Lie algebra of type .

In 1971, Varchenko proved that a family of complex quasi-projective algebraic sets with an irreducible base forms a topologically locally trivial bundle over a Zariski open subset of the base. This statement, conjectured by Oscar Zariski, had filled up a gap in the proof of Zariski's theorem on the fundamental group of the complement to a complex algebraic hypersurface published in 1937. In 1973, Varchenko proved René Thom's conjecture that a germ of a generic smooth map is topologically equivalent to a germ of a polynomial map and has a finite dimensional polynomial topological versal deformation, while the non-generic maps form a subset of infinite codimension in the space of all germs.

Varchenko was among creators of the theory of Newton polygons in singularity theory, in particular, he gave a formula, relating Newton polygons and asymptotics of the oscillatory integrals associated with a critical point of a function. Using the formula, Varchenko constructed a counterexample to V. I. Arnold's semicontinuity conjecture that the brightness of light at a point on a caustic is not less than the brightness at the neighboring points.

Varchenko formulated a conjecture on the semicontinuity of the spectrum of a critical point under deformations of the critical point and proved it for deformations of low weight of quasi-homogeneous singularities. Using the semicontinuity, Varchenko gave an estimate from above for the number of singular points of a projective hypersurface of given degree and dimension.

Varchenko introduced the asymptotic mixed Hodge structure on the cohomology, vanishing at a critical point of a function, by studying asymptotics of integrals of holomorphic differential forms over families of vanishing cycles. Such an integral depends on the parameter – the value of the function. The integral has two properties: how fast it tends to zero, when the parameter tends to the critical value, and how the integral changes, when the parameter goes around the critical value. The first property was used to define the Hodge filtration of the asymptotic mixed Hodge structure and the second property was used to define the weight filtration.

The second part of the 16th Hilbert problem is to decide if there exists an upper bound for the number of limit cycles in polynomial vector fields of given degree. The infinitesimal 16th Hilbert problem, formulated by V. I. Arnold, is to decide if there exists an upper bound for the number of zeros of an integral of a polynomial differential form over a family of level curves of a polynomial Hamiltonian in terms of the degrees of the coefficients of the differential form and the degree of the Hamiltonian. Varchenko proved the existence of the bound in the infinitesimal 16th Hilbert problem.

Vadim Schechtman and Varchenko identified in  the Knizhnik–Zamolodchikov equations (or, KZ equations) with a suitable Gauss–Manin connection and constructed multidimensional hypergeometric solutions of the KZ equations. In that construction the solutions were labeled by elements of a suitable homology group. Then the homology group was identified with a multiplicity space of the tensor product of representations of a suitable quantum group and the monodromy representation of the KZ equations was identified with the associated R-matrix representation. This construction gave a geometric proof of the Kohno-Drinfeld theorem  on the monodromy of the KZ equations. A similar picture was developed for the quantum KZ equations (or, qKZ-type difference equations) in joint works with Giovanni Felder and Vitaly Tarasov. The weight functions appearing in multidimensional hypergeometric solutions were later identified with stable envelopes in Andrei Okounkov's equivariant enumerative geometry.

In the second half of 90s Felder, Pavel Etingof, and Varchenko developed the theory of dynamical quantum groups. Dynamical equations, compatible with the KZ type equations, were introduced in joint papers with G. Felder, Y. Markov, V. Tarasov. In applications, the dynamical equations appear as the quantum differential equations of the cotangent bundles of partial flag varieties.

In, Evgeny Mukhin, Tarasov, and Varchenko proved the conjecture of Boris Shapiro and Michael Shapiro in real algebraic geometry: if the Wronski determinant of a complex finite-dimensional vector space of polynomials in one variable has real roots only, then the vector space has a basis of polynomials with real coefficients.

It is classically known that the intersection index of the Schubert varieties in the Grassmannian of N-dimensional planes coincides with the dimension of the space of invariants in a suitable tensor product of representations of the general linear group . In, Mukhin, Tarasov, and Varchenko categorified this fact and showed that the Bethe algebra of the Gaudin model on such a space of invariants is isomorphic to the algebra of functions on the intersection of the corresponding Schubert varieties. As an application, they showed that if the Schubert varieties are defined with respect to distinct real osculating flags, then the varieties intersect transversally and all intersection points are real. This property is called the reality of Schubert calculus.

Recognition
Varchenko was an invited speaker at the International Congress of Mathematicians in 1974 in Vancouver (section of algebraic geometry) and in 1990 in Kyoto (a plenary address). In 1973 he received the Moscow Mathematical Society Award.

He  was named to the 2023 class of Fellows of the American Mathematical Society, "for contributions to singularity theory, real algebraic geometry, and the theory of quantum integrable systems".

Books
 Arnolʹd, V. I.; Guseĭn-Zade, S. M.; Varchenko, A. N. Singularities of differentiable maps. Vol. I. The classification of critical points, caustics and wave fronts. Monographs in Mathematics, 82. Birkhäuser Boston, Inc., Boston, MA, 1985. xi+382 pp. 
 Arnolʹd, V. I.; Guseĭn-Zade, S. M.; Varchenko, A. N. Singularities of differentiable maps. Vol. II. Monodromy and asymptotics of integrals. Monographs in Mathematics, 83. Birkhäuser Boston, Inc., Boston, MA, 1988. viii+492 pp. 
 Etingof, P.; Varchenko, A. Why the Boundary of a Round Drop Becomes a Curve of Order Four (University Lecture Series), AMS 1992, 
 Varchenko, A. Multidimensional hypergeometric functions and representation theory of Lie algebras and quantum groups. Advanced Series in Mathematical Physics, 21. World Scientific Publishing Co., Inc., River Edge, NJ, 1995. x+371 pp.  
 Varchenko, A. Special functions, KZ type equations, and representation theory. CBMS Regional Conference Series in Mathematics, 98. Published for the Conference Board of the Mathematical Sciences, Washington, DC; by the American Mathematical Society, Providence, RI, 2003. viii+118 pp.

References

External links 

 Varchenko's homepage on the web-site of the University of North Carolina

Russian mathematicians
20th-century American mathematicians
21st-century American mathematicians
1949 births
Living people
Moscow State University alumni
University of North Carolina faculty
Fellows of the American Mathematical Society